Banlieuz'Art (Abbreviated BLZ) is a Guinean hip-hop group from Conakry. Formed in 2004, it is composed of two members: Konko Malela (A.K.A. Marcus )  (née Abdoul Aziz Bangoura) and Soul Dag'One (A.K.A. King Salamon) née Souleymane Sow,.

History

Debut 
Banlieuz'Art was discovered in 2009 after their participation in the project Urban Afreeka with the song Police. While Urban Afreeka sought to unearth acts promoting urban music in Guinea, BLZ were hired for the quality of their composing, as well as the fact that they already had a following, which allowed them to carry out their first album.

Koun Faya Koun 
Two consecutive shows were organised in Conakry (Guinea), February 14, 2010, at the Palais du Peuple. Koun Faya Koun is a  phrase from the Quran which recounts the creation of the Universe by Allah (Let it be, and it was).

Hoping to be a voice for the voiceless, Marcus and King Salamon play a musical style mixing afro-reggae, afro-folk, dancehall and afro-rap. Their songs, with lyrics that are aware, engaged and activist, are translated into malinké, Susu, Fula, wolof, French and English.

Discography

Albums 
2013: Koun Faya Koun, by Marcus and King Salam (Meurs Libre Prod)

 Faya Man
 Ntanto Soussa
 Death Will Let Nobody
 Yandi Wonki
 Life is so Hard
 Assingué
 SOS
 The Day Will Come
 Ghetto Youth
 Ko Ma Bourama

 Faya Man
 Ntanto Soussa
 Death Will Let Nobody
 Yandi Wonki
 Life is so Hard
 Assingué
 SOS
 The Day Will Come
 Ghetto Youth
 Ko Ma Bourama

 Kobena Wati
 Emou Nöma
 Maniamba
 N'kanou
 Fewdhârè
 Khori
 Interlude Wokeli
 Andé
 J'aimerais
 Mikhi Kobi
 Kanlanké
 Gnakhui
 Moumoki
 KonKon

2018: Kalanké, Koun Faya Koun, by Marcus and King Salaman (Urban Connexion)

 Kobena Wati
 Emou Nöma
 Maniamba
 N'kanou
 Fewdhârè
 Khori
 Interlude Wokeli
 Andé
 J'aimerais
 Mikhi Kobi
 Kanlanké
 Gnakhui
 Moumoki
 KonKon

Singles 

 Degg J Force 3 and Banlieuz'Art : in support of the Guinea National Football team during the Africa Cup of Nations before January 17 to February 8, 2015, in Equatorial Guinea, the group Degg J Force 3 featuring with Banlieuz'Art released a single Gbin Gbin Soo.
 Admiral T, Degg J Force 3 et Banlieuz'Art : Put Your Hands Up is a project of Banlieuz'Art, Admiral T and  Degg J Force 3 released in march, 2015 with the Guinean label Meurs Libre Prod.
 Serge Beynaud and Banlieuz'Art : title Téri Ya,
 Eddy Kenzo and Banlieuz'Art : title Kon kon
 Viviane Chidid and Banlieuz'Art : title Lon Kelen

References

Bibliography 
 (en) Nomi Dave, The Revolution’s Echoes: Music, Politics, and Pleasure in Guinea, University of Chicago Press, 2019, 208 p. 
 (en) Chérie Rivers Ndaliko, Samuel Anderson, The Art of Emergency, Oxford University Press, 2020, 352 p. 
 (en) Bram Posthumus, Guinea: Masks, Music and Minerals, Oxford University Press, 2016, 256 p. 

Musical groups established in 2004
Hip hop groups
Guinean musical groups